Frank Fleming (July 5, 1919 – July 22, 1989), sometimes spelled "Flemming" and nicknamed "Boonie", was an American Negro league pitcher in the 1940s.

A native of Morganton, North Carolina, Fleming played for the Cleveland Buckeyes in 1946. He threw a no-hitter the same season while playing for the Asheville Blues. Fleming died in Morganton in 1989 at age 70.

References

External links
Baseball statistics and player information from Seamheads

1919 births
1989 deaths
Cleveland Buckeyes players
People from Morganton, North Carolina
Baseball pitchers
Baseball players from North Carolina
20th-century African-American sportspeople